John Kenneth Macalister (July 19, 1914 – September 14, 1944) was a Rhodes Scholar and a Canadian hero of World War II.

Biography 
Born in Guelph, Ontario, Canada, Ken Macalister graduated from the Guelph Collegiate Vocational Institute (GCVI) and from the University of Toronto, then as a Rhodes Scholar studied at Oxford University. He was expanding his education further at the Institute of Corporate Law in Paris, France when World War II began in 1939. When he took the bar exam, Macalister placed first among over 150 candidates in the British Empire. Macalister tried to join the infantry but his eyesight was such that he needed thick glasses and as such could not be placed on active duty. However, fluent in French, Macalister volunteered for the Special Operations Executive (SOE) F Section where as an agent in France, his thick glasses would actually add to his disguise.

Together with fellow Canadian, Frank Pickersgill, Ken Macalister was parachuted into occupied France on June 20, 1943 to work as wireless operator for the "Archdeacon" network in the Ardennes area.  Both men were picked up by the SOE agent Yvonne Rudellat (codename 'Jacqueline') and the French officer Pierre Culioli. Their vehicle stopped at a German checkpoint in Dhuizon, and after Rudellat and Culioli were cleared they decided to wait for the two Canadians to come through. Minutes later, however, the Canadians' cover was blown and Culioli tried to speed away but he and Rudellat were captured when they ran into another checkpoint about 10 kilometres away. Rudellat subsequently died in Bergen-Belsen; Culioli survived the war.

The Canadians were taken to Fresnes prison where they were interrogated and tortured repeatedly. Macalister steadfastly refused to reveal his security checks to the Germans who had his codes and were anxious to send misleading messages back to the SOE's London headquarters. Macalister gave his interrogators nothing and when his captors tried to send messages, SOE recognized them as fake.

Unable to get anything of value from him, the security forces shipped Macalister, along with Frank Pickersgill and Roméo Sabourin to Buchenwald concentration camp on August 27, 1944. They were known as the Robert Benoist group, executed at Buchenwald on September 14, 1944.

Captain Ken Macalister is honoured on the Brookwood Memorial, Surrey in Brookwood, Surrey, England and as one of the SOE agents who died for the liberation of France, he is listed on the "Roll of Honour" on the Valençay SOE Memorial in the town of Valençay, in the Indre département of France.  He is commemorated by an obelisk at Romorantin-Lanthenay, where he is one of 4 members of SOE to be listed. In Guelph, there’s a park named after him with a maple tree representing his time in Canada, an oak his British sojourn, and a linden his time in France. The University of Toronto has designated a Pickersgill-Macalister garden on the west side of the "Soldiers' Tower" monument.

Further reading
 His story, and that of Frank Pickersgill is told in Unlikely Soldiers: How Two Canadians Fought the Secret War Against Nazi Occupation, by Jonathan Vance (HarperCollins, 2008). This book uses  material from SOE files to tell the story of their endeavours.
 A first-hand account can be found in the letters of Frank Pickersgill, selected and published as The Making of a Secret Agent: Frank Pickersgill by George H. Ford, McClelland & Stewart, 1978.

Notes

External links 
 CWGC: John Kenneth Macalister

1914 births
1944 deaths
Canadian military personnel killed in World War II
Executed spies
Spies who died in Nazi concentration camps
Canadian Army officers
Canadian Intelligence Corps officers
Special Operations Executive personnel
University of Toronto alumni
Canadian Rhodes Scholars 
People from Guelph
Canadian people who died in Buchenwald concentration camp
Canadian people executed in Nazi concentration camps
Canadian Army personnel of World War II